Marco Ercolessi (born 15 May 1986) is an Italian futsal player who plays for Kaos Ferrara and the Italian national futsal team.

References

External links
UEFA profile

1986 births
Living people
Italian men's futsal players
Luparense Calcio a 5 players
Venezia Calcio a 5 players